William England (died 1896) was a successful Victorian photographer specialising in stereoscopic photographs.

Life

Sources disagree on his date of birth, with dates from 1816 to 1830 quoted by different authors. In the 1840s England ran a London daguerreotype portrait studio. In 1854 he joined the London Stereoscopic Company (LSC), where another eminent stereoscopic photographer Thomas Richard Williams was also active at that time. In due course England became the LSC's principal photographer. In 1859 he traveled to America for the LSC and brought back a series of stereoviews of USA and Canada which provided European audiences with some of their first stereoscopic views of North America. In 1862 the LSC paid 3,000 guineas for the exclusive rights to photograph the International Exhibition to be held in South Kensington, London. William England led a team of LSC stereographers, which included William Russell Sedgfield and Stephen Thompson, to produce a series of 350 stereoviews of the exhibition  In 1863 England photographed the Dublin International Exhibition, but later that year he left the LSC to work independently. He subsequently traveled around Germany, Switzerland and Italy, producing highly regarded series of views including a much collected series of Alpine views 'published under the auspices of the Alpine Club'.

In later years he was active in several photographic organizations including the London Photographic Society and the Photographic Society of Great Britain. In 1886, he was a founding member of the Photographic Convention of the United Kingdom.

He died in London in 1896 and was buried in a family grave on the eastern side of Highgate Cemetery.

Notes

External links

Pioneers of photography
19th-century English photographers
1896 deaths
Burials at Highgate Cemetery
Year of birth missing
Photographers from London